Tom Marcello has been a jazz photojournalist since the mid 1970s.   His photos have appeared as album covers, in liner notes, in press kits and in the news.   Among his subjects are Woody Shaw, Zoot Sims, Dexter Gordon, Sonny Stitt, Marvin Peterson, Charles Mingus,  The Heath Brothers, and Kenny Washington.

References

Living people
American photojournalists
Place of birth missing (living people)
21st-century American historians
21st-century American male writers
Jazz writers
Year of birth missing (living people)
American male non-fiction writers